Hans Sven Poulsen (born Bruce Gordon Poulsen, 7 March 1945 – 17 February 2023) was an Australian singer-songwriter and musician of Danish descent who was popular in the late 1960s and early 1970s, and known for his eccentric hippie style. Poulsen had hits with "Boom Sha La La Lo" and "There's a Light Across the Valley" (both in 1970) and had success as a songwriter with "Jamie/Rose Coloured Glasses" for Johnny Farnham and "Monty and Me" for Zoot.

Life and career

Poulsen was born in Melbourne, Australia on 7 March 1945. His parents, Vic and Nellie Poulsen, played two instruments, lap-steel guitar and ukulele with their styles of Hawaiian music, as well as bush ballads, country and western music and folk.

Poulsen has in error often been stated to be born in Denmark, although his descent is Danish, his paternal grandfather had migrated to Victoria, from Denmark during the early 20th century and being proud of his heritage, Poulsen took the first names of "Hans Sven" while still a teenager. It is possible that he took the name as a stage-name when he started his school band in 1961 called the Rimfires; at this time he played around the Frankston area, an outer suburb of Melbourne, and around the Mornington Peninsula region on the coast. It was here that he learnt his craft and became known for his interpretation of the music and songs of Buddy Holly.

In 1965, Poulsen formed the first version of a Melbourne group called 18th Century Quartet, which played original material (mostly by Poulsen) and performed in a style that later came to be known as world music; the group also differed from most of its contemporaries with its use of diverse acoustic instruments including mandolin, autoharp and bouzouki. The second incarnation would be a more pop orientated sound.
 
After embarking on a solo career in 1967, Poulsen had two Australian pop hits with the songs "Boom Sha La La Lo" (1970) and "There's a Light Across the Valley". He also had success as a songwriter with hits written for other artists, including "Rose Coloured Glasses" for John Farnham, "Lady Scorpio" for The Strangers and "Monty and Me" for Zoot. One of his best-known and most successful compositions, "It's Only a Matter of Time", was the much-played B-side of the single "The Real Thing" by Russell Morris, which was an Australian No. 1 hit in May 1969.

In 1972, Poulsen relocated to the Findhorn Foundation spiritual community in north east Scotland, where he recorded three albums, What a Way to Look at Life: Findhorn Foundation Sing-Along, It Can't Be Described in Words and Universal Hands (all 1975, all released on cassette only by the Findhorn Foundation). These featured many of Poulsen's own songs, plus some by other community singers.  Short clips of Poulsen performing several songs are included in the documentary Findhorn, produced in 1974 and reissued on DVD by Earthworks Films in 2006.  Poulsen left Findhorn in 1976.  Poulsen's career was cut short in the late 1970s when he suffered first cancer and then a stroke, and spent several years in hospital. On his recovery he went on to become a music therapist.

Poulsen died on 17 February 2023, at the age of 77.

Publication 
A booklet, Hans Poulsen – Troubadour, was written by Australian music journalist Paul McHenry and published by Moonlight Publications in 1996.

Discography

Albums

Extended plays

Singles

Awards and nominations

Go-Set Pop Poll
The Go-Set Pop Poll was coordinated by teen-oriented pop music newspaper, Go-Set and was established in February 1966 and conducted an annual poll during 1966 to 1972 of its readers to determine the most popular personalities.

|-
| 1970
| himself
| Best Composer 
| style="background:tan;"| 3rd
|-
| rowspan="3"| 1971
| rowspan="2"| himself
| Best Male Vocal
| 5th
|-
| Best Songwriter / Composer
| style="background:tan;"| 3rd
|-
| Best Album
| Natural High 
| style="background:silver;"| 2rd
|-

See also
 GTK (TV series))

References

General
  Note: Archived [on-line] copy has limited functionality.
  Note: [on-line] version established at White Room Electronic Publishing Pty Ltd in 2007 and was expanded from the 2002 edition.

Specific

External links
 
 

1945 births
2023 deaths
Australian people of Danish descent
Findhorn community
Singers from Melbourne